Velmino is a rural locality (a village) in Uzlovsky District of Tula Oblast, Russia.

References

Rural localities in Tula Oblast